Pink Season is the second and final studio album by Pink Guy, a character played by Japanese entertainer and musician George "Joji" Miller. It was released on 4 January 2017. It features 35 songs ranging from various points in his YouTube career and is primarily produced by Miller himself. It peaked at number 70 on the Billboard 200.

Background and release 

George "Joji" Miller, the creator and player of Filthy Frank, has always loved to create music as he elaborates in an interview with Pigeons and Planes.

In 2011, Miller created a channel centered around his character, "Filthy Frank" to promote his music. As his channel grew, he created more bizarre characters, most notably Pink Guy, an aptly named character consisting of Miller in a pink body suit. Periodically, Miller would upload music videos to his channel which were equally diverse in musical design and visuals, ranging from Pink Guy making rice balls to his adoration of hentai.

In 2014, he released a collection of a select number of songs, titled Pink Guy (stylized in all caps), compiled under the pseudonym that most relates to the tone of the music. After the release, Miller went back to his normal uploading schedule.

Throughout mid-2016, he hinted at the release of Pink Season in several of his videos. He continued to hype up his album by promoting on Twitter up until its release.

The streaming service version of Hand On My Gat ends at 1:32 followed by minutes of silence until at the very end a unreleased snippet from his Joji moniker plays.

After the album was released, a new music video was released for the song "Nickelodeon Girls" on 13 March 2017.

A remix EP titled Pink Season: The Prophecy was released on 24 May 2017, featuring remixes by Borgore, Getter, Tasty Treat and Axel Boy.

An unnamed third album (nicknamed "PG3" by some fans) was planned by Miller, along with a "long overdue" tour as the character, but Miller quit the Pink Guy name shortly after this.

Track listing 
All songs are written and produced by George Miller, except where noted.

Notes
 On Filthy Frank's YouTube upload of the album, "Another Earth" was originally subtitled "Young Thug Diss".
 For the tracks "Hand on My Gat", "I Do It for My Hood" and "I Have a Gun", Miller uses the pseudonym PolitikZ, an underground internet rapper character on the Filthy Frank Show.
 After the album's initial release, the third track, "White Is Right", was removed from the iTunes Store, Google Play and Spotify. The original video for the song on YouTube has also been unlisted. No official reason has been given for this removal, though it can be assumed it was due to the song's lyrical content.
 A year after the album's release, in early January 2018, the track "Dog Festival Directions" was removed from the iTunes Store, Google Play, Spotify and YouTube.  No official reason has been given for this removal; however, this came after Miller announced retiring from comedy to pursue his music career. However, on May 18, 2022, the audio was reuploaded onto the "Pink Guy - Topic" channel. It has yet to be reuploaded onto any streaming services.
 The track "We Fall Again", used to be called "wefllagn.ii 5", which later got renamed for the album.

Charts

References 

2017 debut albums
Joji (musician) albums
Comedy hip hop albums
Self-released albums
Trap music albums